Kew is a Metropolitan Borough of Sefton ward in the Southport Parliamentary constituency that covers the localities of Kew and Blowick in the town of Southport. During the 2019 local elections the electorate was 10,064. The population of the ward taken at the 2011 census was 12,631.

Councillors

Election results

Changes in vote share are since the seat was previously contested (i.e. 4 years prior), not since the previous local election.

Elections of the 2020s

Elections of the 2010s

Elections of the 2000s

References

Wards of the Metropolitan Borough of Sefton
Southport